Qingyuan, formerly romanized as Tsingyun, is a prefecture-level city in northern Guangdong province, China, on the banks of the Bei or North River. During the 2020 census, its total population was 3,969,473, out of whom 1,738,424 lived in the built-up (or metro) area made of urbanized Qingcheng and Qingxin districts. The primary spoken language is Cantonese. Covering , Qingyuan is Guangdong's largest prefecture-level division by land area, and it borders Guangzhou and Foshan to the south, Shaoguan to the east and northeast, Zhaoqing to the south and southwest, and Hunan province and Guangxi Zhuang Autonomous Region to the north. The urban core is surrounded by mountainous areas but is directly connected with Guangzhou and the Pearl River Delta by Highway 107.

History
Qingyuan was a prefecture during Northern and Southern dynasties. However, the administration status of Qingyuan was downgraded to a county in the tenth year of the Kaihuang Era of the Sui dynasty (A.D. 590). Since then, until the formation of the Republic of China in 1911, Qingyuan was governed by Guangzhou prefecture.

It was later promoted to prefecture-level city status.

Geography
Its area of over  accounts for 10.6% of the total provincial area. Qingyuan contains part of the southern Nan Ling, and more than half of the area is mountainous, and elevations increase from southeast to northwest. Bordering prefectures are Guangzhou and Foshan to the southeast, Zhaoqing to the southwest, Shaoguan to the north and northeast, Hezhou (Guangxi) to the west, and Yongzhou and Chenzhou (Hunan) to the north.

Economy
Qingyuan is a major economic and transportation hub. The Beijing–Guangzhou Railway, National Highways 106 and 107, and the Bei or North River cross through the city. The maritime infrastructure in Qingyuan plays a vital role in transporting goods to other regional centers in Guangdong, Hong Kong, and Macao. The major ports are Qingyuan Port, Yingde Port, Lianzhou Port, and Yangshan Port.

Demographics
According to the 2010 Census, Qingyuan has a population of 3,698,394 inhabitants, 550,715 more than in 2000 (an annual growth rate of 1.63%). Han Chinese comprise over 95% of the entire population, while there are some areas inhabited by the Zhuang and Yao minorities.

Notable people
 Ayen Ho (何璟昕) : (b. 1994) Chinese C-pop (Cantopop and Mandopop) singer-songwriter
 Xi Nanhua (席南华) : (b. 1963) Chinese mathematician

Attractions
Qingyuan's attractions include Niuyuzui, Feilai Temple, Feixia Scenic Spots, Baojing Palace of Yingde, Taihe Ancient Cave of Qingxin, Sankeng Hot Spring in Qingxin County, Huanghua Lake in Fogang, Little Biejiang of Lianyang, Peak Shikengkong in Yangshan County, Underground River of Lianzhou, Huangteng Gorge, Three Gorges of Huangchuan and Yinzhan Hot Springs.

Administration
The provincial and municipal administration is located in Qingcheng District. It oversees one other district, two county-level cities, four counties, and one economic development district.

Climate

Transportation
Qingyuan is served by Qingyuan railway station, opened in 2009 on the Wuhan–Guangzhou high-speed railway. It is located some distance east of the city.

Qingyuan Maglev is expected to open in December 2020.

Notes

References

Citations

Bibliography
 .

External links

Qingyuan Foreign Trade and Economic Cooperation Bureau
Qianyuan City Customs Authority

 
Prefecture-level divisions of Guangdong